ephPod (pronounced eef-Pod) was a freeware program for Microsoft Windows that managed the interaction between Apple Computer's iPod digital audio player and the computer. It is no longer actively developed.

The EphPod Web site does not recommend EphPod software for iPhone, iPod and iPad models released after 2006. The download page is kept up-to-date and has iPad, iPod Touch and iPhone tools to transfer iPhone music to iTunes and to copy music from PC to iPhone, even for the latest iTunes and iOS versions.

See also
 Comparison of iPod Managers

External links
EphPod official site
IGN
Secrets of the iPod
Do it-yourself iPod projects
How to do everything with your iPod & iPod mini
MP3: Musik finden, laden, hören, brennen

IPod software